FOIA or Foia may refer to:

Law
 Freedom of Information Act 1982, the Australian act
 Freedom of Information Act (United States)
 Freedom of Information Act 2000, the UK act
 Freedom of Information (Scotland) Act 2002
 Freedom of information laws by country

Other
 Fóia (mountain), the highest mountain of Algarve, Portugal
Foia Foia language of Papua New Guinea

See also
 FOI (disambiguation)